Radio Nevesinje or Радио Невесиње is a Bosnian local public radio station, broadcasting from Nevesinje, Bosnia and Herzegovina. It was launched on 13 May 1992.

This radio station broadcasts a variety of programs such as local news and talk shows. The program is mainly produced in Serbian. Estimated number of potential listeners of Radio Nevesinje is around 17,888. Radiostation is also available in municipalities of East Herzegovina and in neighboring Montenegro.

Frequencies
 Nevesinje

See also 
List of radio stations in Bosnia and Herzegovina

References

External links 
 www.fmscan.org
 www.radionevesinje.com
 Communications Regulatory Agency of Bosnia and Herzegovina

Nevesinje
Radio stations established in 1992